Road to Life may refer to:

 Road to Life (1955 film), a 1955 Soviet drama film
 Road to Life (1931 film), a 1931 drama film